A quad is a unit of energy equal to  (a short-scale quadrillion) BTU, or  (1.055 exajoules or EJ) in SI units.

The unit is used by the U.S. Department of Energy in discussing world and national energy budgets.   The global primary energy production in 2004 was 446 quad, equivalent to 471 EJ.

Conversion

Some common types of an energy carrier approximately equal to 1 quad are:
 of gasoline

293.07 terawatt-hours (TWh)
33.434 gigawatt-years (GWy)
36,000,000 tonnes of coal
970,434,000,000 cubic feet of natural gas
5,996,000,000 UK gallons of diesel oil
25,200,000 tonnes of oil
252,000,000 tonnes of TNT or five times the energy of the Tsar Bomba nuclear test
12.69 tonnes of uranium-235 (with 83.14 TJ/kg)
6 s sunlight reaching Earth

See also
 Units of energy
 Orders of magnitude (energy)

References

Units of energy